Martine Sarcey (28 September 1928 – 11 June 2010) was a French stage, film and television actress.

Selected filmography
 Matrimonial Agency (1952)
 Méfiez-vous, mesdames (1963)
 The Thief of Paris (1966)
 The Private Lesson (1968)
 Rendezvous at Bray (1971)
 Un linceul n'a pas de poches (1974)
 Clérambard (1976)
 À nous les petites Anglaises (1976)
 Parisian Life (1977)
 Holiday Hotel (1978)
 Profs (1985)
 The Light (2004)

References

Bibliography
 Amanda Giguere. The Plays of Yasmina Reza on the English and American Stage. McFarland, 2014

External links

1928 births
2010 deaths
French film actresses
French stage actresses
French television actresses
Actresses from Paris